When I Will Be Gone is a Canadian drama film, directed by Jacques Leduc and released in 1998. The film stars Annie Girardot as Caroline Bonhomme, an elderly woman who is preparing for death.

The cast also includes France Castel, Pascale Bussières, Domini Blythe, Widemir Normil, Denise Bombardier and Jean-Guy Bouchard. The film was inspired in part by the death of Leduc's own mother.

Pierre Letarte received a Jutra Award nomination for Best Cinematography at the 1st Jutra Awards in 1999.

References

External links
 

1998 films
1998 drama films
Canadian drama films
French drama films
Films directed by Jacques Leduc
Films shot in Quebec
Films set in Quebec
French-language Canadian films
1990s Canadian films
1990s French films